TDRS-7, known before launch as TDRS-G, is an American communications satellite, of first generation, which is operated by NASA as part of the Tracking and Data Relay Satellite System. It was constructed by TRW as a replacement for TDRS-B, which had been lost in the Challenger accident, and was the last first generation TDRS satellite to be launched.

History
TDRS-7 is based on a custom satellite bus which was used for all seven first generation TDRS satellites. Whilst similar to its predecessors, it differed from them slightly in that twelve G/H band (C band (IEEE)) transponders which had been included on the previous satellites were omitted. It was the last communications satellite, other than amateur radio spacecraft, to be deployed by a Space Shuttle.

Launch

The TDRS-G satellite was deployed from  during the STS-70 mission in 1995. Discovery was launched from Kennedy Space Center Launch Complex 39B at 13:41:55 UTC on 13 July 1995. TDRS-G was deployed from Discovery around six hours after launch, and was raised to geosynchronous orbit by means of an Inertial Upper Stage.

Deployment
The twin-stage solid-propellent Inertial Upper Stage made two burns. The first stage burn occurred around an hour after deployment from Discovery, and placed the satellite into a geosynchronous transfer orbit. At 02:30 UTC on 14 July 1995 it reached apogee, and the second stage fired, placing TDRS-G into geostationary orbit. At this point, it received its operational designation, TDRS-7. It was placed at a longitude 150.0° West of the Greenwich Meridian, where it underwent on-orbit testing. In May 1996, it was moved to 171.0° West where it was stored as an in-orbit spare, and subsequently entered service. In December 2003, it was relocated to 150.5° West. It arrived the next month, and was returned to storage as a reserve satellite.

See also 

 List of TDRS satellites

References 

Communications satellites in geostationary orbit
Spacecraft launched in 1995
TDRS satellites
Spacecraft launched by the Space Shuttle